Limnephilus rhombicus is a species of northern caddisfly in the family Limnephilidae. It is found in Europe and northern Asia (excluding China).

ITIS taxonomic note: 
East Palearctic and Nearctic and West Palearctic.

Subspecies
These two subspecies belong to the species Limnephilus rhombicus:
 Limnephilus rhombicus monolobatus Martynov, 1910
 Limnephilus rhombicus reseri Malicky, 1985

References

Further reading

External links

 

Integripalpia
Articles created by Qbugbot
Insects described in 1758
Taxa named by Carl Linnaeus